Murphy Logo Su'a (born 7 November 1966) is a former New Zealand cricketer, who played 13 Tests and 12 One Day Internationals for New Zealand. He is the 1st Samoan born cricketer to play test cricket for New Zealand.

Murphy Su'a played for the Auckland Cricket Association from 1990 to 1996 and represented New Zealand in that period, including being a member of the 1992 World Cup squad. He played his senior club cricket for Eden Roskill after playing in many junior age group sides in the Northern Districts area. He is the Samoan national coach.

International career
Murphy Su'a made his international debut on 30 January 1992 in the second test of the three-test series against England at Eden Park as he took three wickets. In the process he became the first player with Pacific Island descent to play for New Zealand. Nine day later, he went on to make his One Day International debut against the same team at Carisbrook.

After being selected for the 1992 Cricket World Cup and not receiving a single game, his next international appearance was in the Zimbabwe series where in the second test played at the Harare Sports Club, he recorded his first five-wicket haul in the first innings as he helped New Zealand win by 177 runs. After the series against Sri Lanka where he only took five wickets in the series, he recorded his best test figures of 5–73 against Pakistan in the only test match of that series.

The 1993 series against Australia saw Su'a score his highest test score of 44 in the second innings but not before avoiding being run-out due to the third-umpire as he was comfortably home. In November of that year, he would only go on to play two tests of a three-test series in Australia where he only took three wickets throughout the entire series.

In late 1994, Su'a was selected to play in the Mandela Trophy where he would play in five matches throughout the tournament, taking five wickets at an average of 30 with his best figures of 4/59 being against South Africa on 11 December 1994.

References

External links
 

1966 births
Living people
Auckland cricketers
Cricketers at the 1992 Cricket World Cup
New Zealand One Day International cricketers
New Zealand Test cricketers
New Zealand cricketers
Northern Districts cricketers
New Zealand sportspeople of Samoan descent
Samoan cricketers
North Island cricketers